The 1946 Georgia gubernatorial election took place on November 5, 1946, in order to elect the Governor of Georgia.

Incumbent Democratic Governor Ellis Arnall was term-limited, and ineligible to run for a second term.

As was common at the time, the Democratic candidate ran with only token opposition in the general election so therefore the Democratic primary was the real contest, and winning the primary was considered tantamount to election. The Republican Party was utterly unviable in Georgia at the time, and had not even nominated a candidate of its own.

The election was won by the Democratic nominee and former Governor Eugene Talmadge, who died weeks later in mid-December, before his scheduled inauguration in January 1947. Talmadge's death created the three governors controversy in Georgia.

Democratic primary
The Democratic primary election was held on July 17, 1946. As Talmadge won a majority of county unit votes, there was no run-off.

County unit system
From 1917 until 1962, the Democratic Party in the U.S. state of Georgia used a voting system called the county unit system to determine victors in statewide primary elections.

The system was ostensibly designed to function similarly to the Electoral College, but in practice the large ratio of unit votes for small, rural counties to unit votes for more populous urban areas provided outsized political influence to the smaller counties.

Under the county unit system, the 159 counties in Georgia were divided by population into three categories. The largest eight counties were classified as "Urban", the next-largest 30 counties were classified as "Town", and the remaining 121 counties were classified as "Rural". Urban counties were given 6 unit votes, Town counties were given 4 unit votes, and Rural counties were given 2 unit votes, for a total of 410 available unit votes. Each county's unit votes were awarded on a winner-take-all basis.

Candidates were required to obtain a majority of unit votes (not necessarily a majority of the popular vote), or 206 total unit votes, to win the election. If no candidate received a majority in the initial primary, a runoff election was held between the top two candidates to determine a winner.

Candidates
James V. Carmichael, businessman and former State Representative
Hoke O'Kelley, businessman
Eurith D. Rivers, former Governor
Eugene Talmadge, former Governor

Results

General election
In the general election, Talmadge faced token opposition.

However, from October 3, Talmadge began to suffer from stomach haemorrhages and was unable to attend the state convention in October in Macon.

Political organisations in Georgia's Democratic politics made preparations for the possibility of Talmadge's death by organising write-in votes for other candidates. Notably, 77 write-in votes were received for Herman Talmadge from his home county of Telfair County, probably the result of electoral fraud.

Results
D. Talmadge Bowers was a Republican.

Aftermath
On December 21, 1946, Talmadge died before taking office. The state constitution did not specify who would assume the governorship in such a situation, so three men made claims to the governorship: Ellis Arnall, the outgoing governor; Melvin E. Thompson, the lieutenant governor-elect; and Herman Talmadge, Eugene Talmadge's son.

Thompson wanted the General Assembly to certify the election returns before addressing the issue of who should be governor. Once the certification was done, Thompson would have a stronger claim, as he would officially be the Lieutenant Governor-elect, but Talmadge's forces were successful in postponing the certification. The state constitution suggested that in the circumstances, the Assembly could choose between the top two candidates still living. On January 15, 1947, the General Assembly elected Herman Talmadge as governor.

The state's highest court, the Supreme Court of Georgia, ruled in March 1947 that the legislature had violated the state constitution by electing Talmadge governor and that Thompson should serve as governor until the next general election in November 1948. The court directed that in November 1948 there would be a special election at which voters would choose someone to complete Eugene Talmadge's term.

References

Notes

Bibliography
 
 

1946
Georgia
Gubernatorial
November 1946 events in the United States